Lewis A. Sharpe (14 July 1906 – 19 March 2001) was an Australian rules footballer who played with St Kilda, Footscray, Fitzroy and Essendon in the Victorian Football League (VFL).

Sharpe had a much traveled career, which began at Kernot in 1924. He then played with Loch the following year and joined St Kilda during the 1926 season. After a year and a half with St Kilda, he went to Wonthaggi. He resumed in the VFL in 1929 when he played 11 games for Footscray, the most he ever played in a league season. In 1930 he crossed to Blackwood as captain-coach but after a year was back in Melbourne, playing for Fitzroy. He captain-coached Dalyston to a premiership in 1933 and played at Essendon in 1934. Having played just once for Essendon, Sharpe returned to Loch for a season, before going to Archer's Creek as their new captain-coach.

References

1906 births
Australian rules footballers from Victoria (Australia)
St Kilda Football Club players
Western Bulldogs players
Fitzroy Football Club players
Essendon Football Club players
2001 deaths